Professor Frederick William Shotton FRS (1906–1990) was a British geologist. He was awarded the Prestwich Medal in 1954.

Shotton's research into the geological makeup of Normandy beaches helped allied commanders decide which were the best to use on D-Day. From May 1941 to September 1943, based in Egypt, he used hydrogeology to guide development of potable water supplies for British forces operational in the Middle East and northern Africa. From October 1943 he helped plan for the Allied liberation of Normandy by providing terrain evaluation (primarily through preparation of specialist maps and contribution of technical advice) relating to beach conditions, suitability of ground for the rapid construction of temporary airfields, and water supply. Following D-Day, 6 June 1944, he was based in northern France and later Belgium, and was involved with further water supply tasks, discussions on quarrying of aggregate, and assessment of soil conditions likely to influence off-road vehicle mobility or the siting of airfields and military depots, thus contributing to Allied victory in Europe in May 1945. He was appointed an MBE in recognition of his military geological work. Shotton's pioneering Quaternary research resulted in his election as a Fellow of the Royal Society. Shotton was Head of the Geology Department at the University of Birmingham from 1949 until his retirement in 1974. He was also Vice-Principal of Birmingham University.

Ice Age Warwickshire Interpretation Panel and tribute to Fred Shotton
As part of an Aggregates Levy Sustainability Fund (ALSF) supported project, an interpretation board was installed on Wolston Village Green. It illustrates the environment that existed in the area about 500,000 years ago. The panel was designed by Jeff Jones of The Drawing Room in Leamington Spa and depicts 'Heidelberg Man' hunting his prey along the banks of the Bytham River. More detail is provided on the nature of some of the evidence - pollen, mammal remains and the fine artefacts found at Waverley Wood and Brandon. After recounting the story of the advance of the main Anglian ice sheet, the account concludes by highlighting the massive diversion of drainage caused by the ice. Many members of Fred Shotton's immediate family were present as the panel was unveiled by his daughter, Ann Black.

References

External links
'Wolston Interpretation Panel' in liaison with the Warwickshire Geological Conservation Group (WGCG)

20th-century British geologists
Fellows of the Royal Society
1906 births
1990 deaths
Academics of the University of Birmingham